Castelfranco Veneto is a town and comune of Veneto, northern Italy, in the province of Treviso,  by rail from the town of Treviso.

History
The town originates from a castle built here by the commune of Treviso in the course of its strife against Padua (1195). In 1246, it was captured by Ezzelino III da Romano, returning to Treviso after his death in 1259. In 1329, it was acquired by Cangrande I della Scala, lord of Verona. Ten years later, together with Treviso, it was handed over to the Republic of Venice, to which it belonged until 1797. Castelfranco Veneto then followed the history of Veneto. Indeed, the hand over to the "Serenissima" closes over a century of war events for the town. With its lands finally quiet and safe, some of the richest Venetian patrician families began undertaking several investments, laying down the foundations for the development of a relatively large area that will start one of its most prominent economic and cultural booming from the early decades of the sixteenth century. Almost freed from the rigid military dimension of the castle during the sixteenth century, Castelfranco Veneto transformed itself in a "quasi-city" (the expression was created by the historian Giorgio Chittolini), through a dynamic process of evolution of its economic fabric, as well as its redevelopment and thickening of its public and private building heritage.

Main sights

The older part of the town is square, surrounded by medieval walls and towers constructed by the people of Treviso in 1211 (see Cittadella).

Castelfranco Veneto was the birthplace of the painter Giorgione, and the cathedral, named il Duomo (1723), located inside the walls, contains one of his finest works, the Madonna with St. Francis and Liberalis (1504), but more commonly called Pala del Giorgione. In the background, the towers of the old town may be seen. The painting was being restored in Venice, Italy; however, ceremonies were held for the return of 'La Pala' near the end of 2005.

The cathedral itself was designed by Francesco Maria Preti, over an ancient Romanesque church.
Other artpieces include seven fragments of frescoes by Paolo Veronese.

Transport
Castelfranco Veneto railway station, opened in 1877, is a junction of three railway lines, the Trento–Venice railway, the Vicenza–Treviso railway and the Calalzo–Padua railway, respectively.  As such, it is one of the busiest railway junctions in Veneto.

People born in Castelfranco Veneto
Giorgione (1477–1510), painter.
Agostino Steffani (1655–1728), Catholic bishop, diplomat, and composer.
Francesco Maria Preti (1701–1774), architect
Paola Drigo (1876–1938), writer
Tina Anselmi (1927–2016), prominent member of the Italian resistance movement, later politician, first woman to hold a ministerial position in Italy
Donatella Rettore (born 1953), singer and songwriter
Francesco Guidolin (born 1955), football manager
Pia Parolin (born 1965), biologist and tropical ecologist
Manuela Giugliano (born 1997), football player

Twin towns
 Guelph, Ontario, Canada

References

External links

Cities and towns in Veneto